William Drury Gayle (August 25, 1859 – March 4, 1939) was an American businessman and politician.

Gayle was born in Lincoln, Illinois. He was the owner of the Lincoln Monument Company in Lincoln, Illinois. Gayle served on the Lincoln City Council and as Mayor of Lincoln. He also served on the school board and was a Democrat. He served on the Logan County Board of Review and as the deputy county collector. Gayle served in the Illinois House of Representatives in 1933 and 1934. Gayle died at St. Clara Hospital in Lincoln, Illinois after suffering a heart attack at the Eagle's Club.

Notes

External links

1859 births
1939 deaths
People from Lincoln, Illinois
Businesspeople from Illinois
School board members in Illinois
Mayors of places in Illinois
Illinois city council members
Democratic Party members of the Illinois House of Representatives